The men's high jump event at the 2017 Summer Universiade was held on 23 and 25 August in Taipei City.

Medalists

Results

Qualification
Qualification: 2.23 m (Q) or at least 12 best (q) qualified for the final.

Final

References

High
2017 in women's athletics
2017